Emily Caroline "Lily" Bristow (1864 – 5 August 1935) was an English mountaineer who made numerous ascents in the Swiss Alps with Albert F. Mummery in the 1890s.

Early life
Bristow was born in Brixton, Surrey, to George Ledgard Bristow and his wife, Mary.

Climbing career

She made her first significant mountain ascent in 1892 when she climbed the Aiguille des Grands Charmoz in the Mont Blanc massif with Albert F. Mummery and his wife Mary. With their success, Bristow and Mary Mummery became the first women to climb the mountain. In 1893, Bristow climbed the Aiguille du Grépon—the ascent for which she was best known. This was the second-ever traverse of the Grépon, which had first been climbed by Albert Mummery two years earlier. The same year, she successfully climbed the Aiguille du Dru, the Zinalrothorn and the Matterhorn. She was known for climbing without local guides and for occasionally leading her climbing parties' ascents. Bristow's guideless ascent of the Grépon inspired Mummery to write: "All mountains appear doomed to pass through three stages: An inaccessible peak, the hardest climb in the Alps, an easy day for a lady."

It was noted that Bristow caused scandal amongst her acquaintances by choosing to share tents with men. Some have speculated that Mary Mummery later forbade her husband from climbing with Bristow, since Bristow did not accompany him on any of his 1894 expeditions, and there are no records of Bristow continuing her climbing career following his death on Nanga Parbat in 1895.

In media

Elisa Kay Sparks has speculated that Lily Briscoe, a character in Virginia Woolf's novel To the Lighthouse, was named after Bristow.

References

English mountain climbers
Female climbers
1864 births
1935 deaths